Aaraas is a Norwegian surname. Notable people with the surname include:

Hans Aaraas (1919–1998), Norwegian writer
Hans Aaraas (musician), Norwegian musician
Jon Aaraas (born 1986), Norwegian ski jumper
Olav Aaraas (born 1950), Norwegian historian

Norwegian-language surnames